The Abbey of Saint-Germain d'Auxerre is a former Benedictine monastery in central France, dedicated to its founder Saint Germain of Auxerre, the bishop of Auxerre, who died in 448. It was founded on the site of an oratory built by Germanus in honor of Saint Maurice.

History
Bishop Germain was buried in the Oratory of Saint Maurice, which he had built. About the year 500, it was rebuilt as a basilica, by Queen Clotilda, wife of Clovis, in honor of the bishop. The tomb was below the church, under the apse.

A monastery was established that followed the Benedictine rule. In 850 Abbot Conrad, brother-in-law of Louis the Pious, had a crypt built. Attached to the crypt was a circular oratory. Conrad's nephew, Emperor Charles the Bald, was present at the translation of the relics of Germanus. The abbey reached the apex of its cultural importance during the Carolingian era; the source for its early history is an account of the Miracula Sancti Germani Episcopi Autissiodorensis ("Miracles of Saint Germain, Bishop of Auxerre") written before ca. 880. The earliest surviving architectural remains are also of the ninth century. The abbey had a noted school. From 876 to 883 Remigius of Auxerre was master of the school. Later, Thomas Becket studied there after completing his law courses in Bologna. Monk and chronicler, Rodulfus Glaber, spent time at St Germain, where, he said, foreign monks were always accepted with respect.

The abbey was twice reformed, first by Majolus of Cluny and his disciple Heldric, at the request of Henry I, Duke of Burgundy, and in 1029 by the Congregation of Saint Maur. A fire consumed much of the abbey in 1064; the Merovingian nave was rebuilt. In 1069, monks from St. Germain founded Selby Abbey in North Yorkshire. Napoleon turned the establishment into a hospital.

In 1927, beneath the 17th-century frescoed plaster walls of the crypt, were discovered ninth-century wall frescoes, the only surviving large-scale paintings of their date in France to compare to the illuminated manuscripts.<ref>Edward S. King, "The Carolingian Frescoes of the Abbey of Saint Germain d'Auxerre" The Art Bulletin;; 11.4 (December 1929), pp. 357-375.</ref>

During the Revolution, several bays of the nave were demolished and the secularized abbey was used as a hospital. The former nave extended beneath the present forecourt.

In the late twentieth century the abbey's residential and service buildings were remodeled as a museum, presenting prehistoric, Gallo-Roman and medieval finds from Auxerre. An exhibition in 1990 brought the abbey's cultural impact into focus. The former abbey church remains in use for worship at stated times.

Known abbots

 ? - 622: Palladius of Auxerre
 800? - 840?: Saint Abbo, Bishop of Auxerre († December 3, 860)
 850? - †864: Conrad I, Count of Auxerre
 [...]? - 886? : Abbot Hugh († May 12, 886)
 894-921: Richard Duke of Bourgogne11. ? -? : Heldric7,12 († 999), contemporary of St. Sévin Bishop of Sens.
 986 - 1009: Heldric of Cluny
 1010-1020: Achard
 1020 - 1032: Theobold
 1032 - 1052: Odo of Auxerre
 1052 - 1064: Prior Boso
 1064 - 1074: Walter from Saint-Benoît-sur-Loire
 1075 - 1085: Roland
 1085 - 1096: Guibert
 1096-1100: Robert
 1100-1115: Hugues de Montaigu, son of Dalmace Semur said Jeune14 approve this year a charter for the benefit of the Priory of Saint-Marcel Fleurey-sur-Ouche, signed by Duke Hugh II Bourgogne15. It will be bishop of Auxerre.
 1115 - 1148: Gervais
 1148 - 1174: Harduin
 1174 - 1188: Humbert
 1188 - 1208: Rudolph
 1st half of the thirteenth century: Renaud Jocenal (alive May 13, 1222)
 1285 - 1309: Guy Munois
 1309 - 1334: Left Dignon Chéu
 1334 - 1352: Étienne 1 Chitry
 1352 - 1362: William Grimoard, future Pope Urban V
 1362 - 1381: Stephen II Chitry
 1381 - 1408: Hugues V of Ballore
 1409 - 1422: John II of Nanton
 1422/1423 - 1453: Hervé de Lugny
 1453 - 1495: Hugues VI Tyard or Thiard
 1542: Louis Lorraine17
 1731: Dom Leonardo Le Texier, Grand Prior (1731).
 1783: Dom Rosman

See also

 Haimo of Auxerre

Notes

References
Christian Sapin, La Bourgogne préromane (Paris, 1986), pp. 41–63 (on the early building project)Abbaye Saint-Germain d'Auxerre: intellectuels et artistes dans l'Europe carolingienne, IXe - XIe siecles (Auxerre, 1990) Exhibition catalogue.Auxerre et les prémices de l'art roman'' (Auxerre, 1999) Exhibition catalogue.
Noëlle Deflou-Leca, Saint-Germain d'Auxerre et ses dépendances (Ve-XIIIe siècle), PSE, 2010, p773.
Constance Britain-Bouchard, "Sword, Miter and Cloister", Cornell University Press 1987

External links
Culture.gouv.fr: Saint-Germain d'Auxerre 
Saint Germain d'Auxerre: recent archaeology
Saint Germain d'Auxerre on the site Bourgogne Romane

Benedictine monasteries in France
5th-century establishments in sub-Roman Gaul 
18th-century disestablishments in France
Buildings and structures in Yonne